Ghost on the Canvas is the sixty-first album by Glen Campbell, which was intended to be Campbell's farewell studio recording following him being diagnosed with Alzheimer's disease. The production of the album was announced in March 2010.

Campbell and his wife delayed informing the public about his illness until shortly before he embarked on the Glen Campbell Goodbye Tour. The Campbells decided to announce his diagnosis so that his audience would understand why the performer might mistake the lyrics to songs or behave erratically. They also wished to combat the social stigma of Alzheimer's, for the benefit of others suffering from the disease.

Recording
Campbell first became aware of his affliction with Alzheimer's while recording the music in 2009, although his wife Kim had suspected that his memory was faulty several years prior. Campbell and producer Julian Raymond decided to record one final studio album of original material while he was in good enough health, with Raymond taking the lead to contact other artists for collaboration.

The collaborative album is intended as a companion piece to 2008's Meet Glen Campbell—on that recording, Campbell recorded covers of contemporary songs to introduce himself to a new audience and this album includes younger rock stars to compose and record with Campbell. Campbell worked with Raymond for those sessions and Raymond used a notebook to record Campbell's conversations between takes, so the two could collaborate on writing new material based on stories from Campbell's life, starting with the autobiographical "A Better Place". The title track—written by Paul Westerberg—previously appeared on Westerberg's 2009 extended play PW & The Ghost Gloves Cat Wing Joy Boys.

At the time of the album's release, Campbell expressed interest in possibly recording further material, but thought it unlikely that he would record an entire studio album. He did, however, return to the studio long enough to produce two final albums: 2012's See You There which re-records many of his hits and was largely put to tape at the same time as Ghost on the Canvas and 2017's covers album Adiós, recorded in 2013.

Reception

BBC Music reviewer Martin Aston has called Ghost on the Canvas "a fine way to bow out of the business", citing Rick Rubin's production work with Johnny Cash through American Recordings. Aston continued that Campbell's vocal performance remains strong and the instrumental interludes were reminiscent of The Beach Boys' Pet Sounds. Consequence of Sound's Nick Freed also compared this album to Cash's final output, noting that Ghost on the Canvas and Cash's American Recordings material shift from straight country music to different pop genres. Both Freed and Andy Gill of The Independent commented on the themes of mortality and finality in the lyrics.

The Washington Posts Allison Stewart found the collaborative nature of the album a weakness, turning melancholy into overwrought sentiment. Christopher Muther of The Boston Globe considers the album "gorgeous and charming", but finds the sentimentality "overshadows Campbell's emotional and musical growth." Mick Brown of The Daily Telegraph has noted the hopeful tone of the lyrics, influenced by Campbell's deteriorating health.

Mojo placed the album at number 44 on its list of the "Top 50 Albums of 2011".

Track listing
All songs co-written by Glen Campbell and Julian Raymond, except where noted
"A Better Place" – 1:51
"Ghost on the Canvas" (Paul Westerberg) – 4:13
"The Billstown Crossroads" (Roger Joseph Manning, Jr.) – 1:04
"A Thousand Lifetimes" (Campbell, Justin Grey, and Raymond) – 4:09
"It's Your Amazing Grace" – 3:14
"Second Street North" (Manning) – 0:35
"In My Arms" (Teddy Thompson) – 3:27
"May 21, 1969" (Manning) – 0:34
"Nothing But the Whole Wide World" (Jakob Dylan) – 3:41
"Wild and Waste" (Manning) – 1:13
"Hold on Hope" (Robert Pollard) – 3:33
"Valley of the Son" (Manning) – 0:57
"Any Trouble" (Westerberg)  – 3:00
"Strong" – 3:33
"The Rest Is Silence" (Manning) – 0:50
"There's No Me... Without You" – 6:16

Amazon MP3 and iTunes Store bonus tracks
"What I Wouldn't Give" – 2:38
"Wish You Were Here" (Jimmy Webb) – 3:51 (song re-titled for this album, originally entitled "Postcard from Paris")
The deluxe edition of the album also includes five bonus tracks recorded on The Glen Campbell Goodtime Hour
Note: Bonus tracks no longer included with Amazon MP3 purchase (December 5, 2015).

Tour

Personnel
Glen Campbell – acoustic and electric guitar, vocals

Additional musicians and composers
Kim Bullard – keyboards
Shannon Campbell – vocals
Chris Chaney – bass guitar
Vinnie Colaiuta – drums
Katie Cole – vocals
Billy Corgan – electric guitar on "There's No Me... Without You"
Dick Dale – electric guitar on "In My Arms"
George Doering – acoustic guitar, banjo, and mandolin
Eric Dover – vocals
Jakob Dylan – composition
Jason Falkner – acoustic and electric guitar, bass guitar
Josh Freese – drums
Jessy Greene - violin
Justin Grey – composition
Peter Holmström – electric guitar on "Strong"
Steve Hunter – electric guitar"There's No Me... Without You"
Chris Isaak – vocals on "In My Arms"
Corky James – acoustic guitar
Danny Levin – trumpet
Roger Joseph Manning, Jr. – keyboards, vocals
Wendy Melvoin – electric guitar
Rick Nielsen – electric guitar on "There's No Me... Without You"
Tim Pierce – acoustic and electric guitar, mandolin
Robert Pollard – composition
Zac Rac – keyboards
Julian Raymond – vocals, arrangement, production, co-writing
Marty Rifkin – dobro and pedal steel guitar on "There's No Me... Without You"
Brian Setzer – electric guitar on "In My Arms" and "There's No Me... Without You"
Eric Skodis – vocals
Aaron Sterling – drums
Courtney Taylor-Taylor – keyboards on "Strong"
Teddy Thompson – composition
Keith Urban
Michael Ward – electric guitar
Paul Westerberg – composition
Todd Youth – electric guitar

Technical staff
Chris Anthony – photography
Kii Arens – cover art
Brian Gardner – mastering
Dave Kaplan – executive production
Bennett Salvay – string arrangement, conducting
Scott Silver – executive production
Kevin Tetreault – art direction, layout
Howard Willing – production, engineering

Chart performance

See also
Glen Campbell: I'll Be Me, a 2014 documentary

References

External links

Press release from Surfdog Records

Ghost on the Canvas at Metacritic
[ Chart history] from Billboard.com

2011 albums
Collaborative albums
Glen Campbell albums
Surfdog Records albums
Albums produced by Julian Raymond